The men's 100 metre backstroke event at the 2014 Commonwealth Games as part of the swimming programme took place on 24 and 25 July at the Tollcross International Swimming Centre in Glasgow, Scotland.

The medals were presented by Judy Simons, President of the Bermuda Olympic Association and the quaichs were presented by Andrew Fraser, 2013 Jim Clark Memorial Award winner and Ford's Gasoline Calibration Manager.

Records
Prior to this competition, the existing world and Commonwealth Games records were as follows.

The following records were established during the competition:

Results

Heats

Semifinals

Final

References

External links

Men's 100 metre backstroke
Commonwealth Games